Maurice Stein (October 1, 1884, Berg - March 7, 1957) was a Luxembourgish Captain (honorary major) who headed the Gendarme and the Volunteer Corps. He was married to Georgette Schulze.

Biography 
Stein began in the lower ranks of the Volunteer Corps of Luxembourg, which he entered on the 7 of August, 1905, before being promoted to Lieutenant on October 18, 1909. On the 31 of January, 1915, Maurice was attached to the Gendarme, and placed issued the position of military district commander for Diekirch.

Stein oversaw the Gendarmes at the time of the German invasion of Luxembourg in 1940. Prior to the outbreak of hostilities, a series of nine radio outposts were established along the German border, each manned by gendarmes, with a central radio receiver in Captain Stein's official office near the volunteers' Saint-Esprit Barracks in the capital.

References

External links 
 A photograph of Maurice Stein

Luxembourgian soldiers
Military leaders of World War II